The Libertarian Party of Illinois is the Illinois affiliate of the Libertarian Party. The current state chair is Chase Renwick. There are five Libertarian officeholders in Illinois.

Mission statement
Libertarian Party of Illinois mission is: To elect Libertarians to office and move public policy in a libertarian direction.

Key tenets

Key tenets of the Libertarian Party platform include the following:
 Adoption of laissez-faire principles to reduce the state's role in economic government.  This would include, among other things, markedly reduced taxation, privatization of Social Security and welfare (for individuals, as well as elimination of "corporate welfare"), markedly reduced regulation of business, rollbacks of labor regulations, and reduction of government interference in foreign trade.
 Protection of property rights.
 Minimal government bureaucracy. The Libertarian Party states that the government's responsibilities should be limited to the protection of individual rights from the initiation of force and fraud.
 Civil libertarianism: Support for the protection of civil liberties, including the right to privacy, freedom of speech, freedom of association, and sexual freedom.
 Opposition to laws such as affirmative action and some non-discrimination laws in the private sector.
 Support for the unrestricted right to the means of self-defense (such as gun rights, the right to carry mace, pepper spray, or tasers etc.).
 Opposition to the censoring of foreign radio pathways.
 Abolition of laws against "victimless crimes" (such as prostitution, seat belt laws, use of controlled substances, fraternization, etc.).
 Opposition to regulations on how businesses should run themselves (e.g. smoking bans)
 A foreign policy of free trade and non-interventionism.
 Support for a fiscally responsible government including a hard currency (commodity-based money supply as opposed to fiat currency).
 Abolition of all forms of taxpayer-funded assistance (welfare, food stamps, public housing, Health care, etc.)
 A pro-choice belief that abortion is a personal issue, and should not be part of government.

State and student affiliates
 DuPage Libertarians
 Bond County Libertarians
 Champaign County Libertarian Party
 Fox Valley Libertarian Party
 Libertarian Party of Chicago
 McLean County Libertarian Party
 Metro-East Libertarian Party
 Libertarian Party of Will County
 Sangamon County Libertarian Party (Now Forming)
 Southern Illinois Libertarian Party
 Libertarian Party of Greater Peoria
 Libertarian Party of Lake County
 Macoupin County Libertarian Party
 Illinois Valley Libertarians
 Western Illinois Libertarian Party
 Clinton County Libertarian Party
 Libertarian Party of Whiteside County
 Winnebago County Libertarian Party (Now Forming)
 Libertarian Party of Macon County
 Kankakee County Libertarian Party
 Libertarian Party of Northwestern Illinois
 Warren County Libertarian Party
 McHenry County Libertarians
 Libertarian Party of DeKalb County
 South Cook County Libertarians
 Northwest Cook County Libertarians
 North Shore Cook County Libertarians
 Tazewell County Libertarian Party
 DeWitt County Libertarian Party
 Fulton County Libertarians (Now Forming)

Elected officeholders
As of April 9, 2022, the Libertarian Party of Illinois lists eight officeholders in the state. However, John Prentice is not the Village President of Paw Paw, IL, Jasen Howard resigned his office in June 2021, and Brody Anderson vacated office in October 2021 The majority of these officeholders hold nonpartisan office.
 Aisha Pickett, City Treasurer of Harvey
 Brandon Wisenburg, Village Trustee of Peoria Heights
Jacob Collins, member of the Kankakee County Board
Jonathan Russell, member of the Harrisburg Community Unit School District #3 Board of Education
Kelly Liebmann, Township Trustee of Greenwood Township

Electoral history 1998–2020

2020 campaigns

2018 campaigns

2016 campaigns

2014 campaigns

2012 campaigns

2010 campaigns

2008 campaigns

2006 campaigns

2004 campaigns

2002 campaigns

2000 campaigns

1998 campaigns

See also
 List of state Libertarian Parties in the United States

References

External links
 
 Libertarian Party (United States)
 Libertarian Party of Chicago

Illinois
Political parties in Illinois